Richard Stanley Williams (born 1951) is a research scientist in the field of nanotechnology and a Senior Fellow and the founding director of the Quantum Science Research Laboratory at Hewlett-Packard. He has over 57 patents, with 40 more patents pending. At HP, he led a group that developed a working solid state version of Leon Chua's memristor.

Williams earned a bachelor's degree in chemical physics in 1974 from Rice University and a Ph.D. in physical chemistry from the University of California, Berkeley in 1978. After graduating, he worked at Bell Labs before joining the faculty at UCLA, where he served as a professor from 1980 to 1995. He then joined HP Labs as director of its Information and Quantum Systems Lab.

Awards and honors
 Foresight Institute Feynman Prize in Nanotechnology (2000)
 Herman Bloch Medal for Industrial Research (2004)
 Julius Springer Prize for Applied Physics (2000)
 Glenn T. Seaborg Medal, UCLA (2007)

References

External links
His Nov. 28, 2008, article on Memristors in IEEE Spectrum

Living people
Rice University alumni
Scientists at Bell Labs
UC Berkeley College of Chemistry alumni
21st-century American physicists
Hewlett-Packard people
University of California, Los Angeles faculty
1951 births